Saint-Quentin-en-Yvelines–Montigny-le-Bretonneux is a station on the Paris–Brest railway. It is served by Paris's express suburban rail system, the RER Line C and by suburban Transilien Line N and U services. The station opened in 1975. It is within Montigny-le-Bretonneux.

See also 
 List of stations of the Paris RER

References

External links

 

Réseau Express Régional stations
Railway stations in Yvelines
Railway stations in France opened in 1975